Michael Cole was an Australian singer and actor. He appeared in a number of Australian musicals.

Select TV Credits
Johnny Belinda (1959)
Pardon Miss Westcott (1959)
Gaslight Music Hall (1959)
Luther (1964)
Northern Safari (1966) - singer
Homicide - various guest roles
The ABC of Love and Sex: Australia Style (1977)
Skyways - various roles
Cop Shop - various roles
Prisoner: Cell Block H - various roles

Select Theatre Credits
Lola Montez (1958)

References

External links
Michael Cole at IMDb

Australian actors